Sant Julià del Llor i Bonmatí is a municipality in the comarca of la Selva in 
Catalonia, Spain.

Villages
Bonmatí, 898
Sant Julià del Llor, 109

References

 Panareda Clopés, Josep Maria; Rios Calvet, Jaume; Rabella Vives, Josep Maria (1989). Guia de Catalunya, Barcelona: Caixa de Catalunya.  (Spanish).  (Catalan).

External links 

Pàgina web de l'Ajuntament
 Government data pages 

Municipalities in Selva